William Graham Swan (1821 – April 12, 1869) was an American attorney and politician active primarily in East Tennessee during the mid-19th century.  Swan served in the Confederate States Congress during the American Civil War, and served one term as mayor of Knoxville, Tennessee, from 1855 until late 1856. He also helped establish the town of East Knoxville (later annexed by Knoxville), and served as its first mayor in the late 1850s. In 1854, Swan and his brother-in-law, Joseph Mabry, donated the initial land for the formation of Market Square in downtown Knoxville.

Biography

Early life
Swan's early life is obscure, but he was likely born in East Tennessee or Alabama. He graduated from East Tennessee College (now the University of Tennessee) in 1838, and studied law afterward.  By 1843, he had a law office on Gay Street in Knoxville, and he attended courts in Knox, Anderson, Roane, Campbell, and Claiborne counties.  He served as Attorney General of Tennessee 1851 until 1853.

1850s

Throughout the early 1850s, Swan speculated in land along the periphery of Knoxville, especially in what is now East Knoxville, which he helped develop.  In 1854, he and Mabry purchased several acres of land then located north of Knoxville (the boundary at the time being Union Avenue).  They donated a portion of this land to the city for creation of a Market House, laying the foundation for what is now Market Square.  That same year, Swan and William Montgomery Churchwell founded the Knoxville Gas Light Company, which installed the first gas lights on Gay Street.

Swan was elected Mayor of Knoxville in 1854, succeeding James C. Luttrell, and served in this capacity from 1855 through most of 1856.  He made a number of progressive proposals, including the construction of a tunnel to allow development over the railroad, and the digging of a canal between First Creek and Second Creek to give factories navigable access to the Tennessee River (both proposals were rejected). A measure was also passed during Swan's tenure that attempted to rein in the city's growing number of noisy saloons by giving the city recorder the authority to close saloons for an indefinite period of time.

In 1855, Swan met John Mitchel, an Irish nationalist visiting in Knoxville while in exile.  Swan and Mitchel established a radical newspaper, the Southern Citizen, in 1857.  This newspaper defended the South and the practice of slavery, and went so far as to call for the reopening of the Atlantic slave trade.

In 1856, Swan was elected the first mayor of East Knoxville, which he had helped incorporate the previous year.  Swan served as the new city's mayor until 1859. East Knoxville was annexed by Knoxville in 1868.

Civil War
In the years leading up the Civil War, Swan was a staunch secessionist.  Radical pro-Unionist William "Parson" Brownlow, whose Knoxville Whig had been quarreling with the Knoxville Register (which was co-owned by Swan) since the early 1850s, stepped up his attacks on Swan, calling him an unprincipled politician who had defected to the Democratic Party only after being snubbed by the Whigs. When Brownlow was arrested by Confederate authorities in late 1861, Swan wrote a letter to Jefferson Davis demanding that Brownlow be hanged.

Swan was elected to the First Confederate Congress in November 1861, having easily defeated Knoxville attorney John Baxter, and was reelected in 1863.  As a congressman, Swan proposed high import taxes on European nations that refused to recognize the Confederacy, rejected federal taxation, and rejected the arming of slaves. In 1864, Swan made national headlines when he attacked fellow Tennessee congressman Henry S. Foote, who had criticized Swan's friend, John Mitchel.

After the war, Swan settled in Memphis, Tennessee, where he practiced law.  He died of consumption on April 12, 1869, and was interred in Elmwood Cemetery the same day.

References

External links
 Political Graveyard

Members of the Confederate House of Representatives from Tennessee
19th-century American politicians
Mayors of Knoxville, Tennessee
Tennessee Democrats
Tennessee lawyers
Tennessee Attorneys General
1821 births
1869 deaths
University of Tennessee alumni
Tennessee Whigs
19th-century American lawyers
19th-century deaths from tuberculosis
Tuberculosis deaths in Tennessee